The 2013 Tokyo Yakult Swallows season is the 63rd season of the franchise of Nippon Professional Baseball, their 50th season at Meiji Jingu Stadium, and their 49th under Yakult Honsha. This season was notable because outfielder Wladimir Balentien broke Sadaharu Oh's single season home-run record, hitting 60 home runs. Balentien also broke the All-Asian single season record set by former Samsung Lions first baseman Lee Seung-yuop, both in the same game by hitting his 56th and 57th home runs in a game against the Hanshin Tigers. This was also the Swallows' 4th season under manager Junji Ogawa, and the last one of his first stint as manager.

Regular season 
The Swallows finished in dead last, with a 57-83-4 record, 28 and a half games back of the first place Yomiuri Giants.

References 

Tokyo Yakult Swallows seasons